Leptolucania ommata, the Pygmy killifish, is a species of North American killifish found only in the southeastern United States. This fish is also found in the aquarium trade. This species grows to a length of  TL.  It is the only known member of its genus. The pygmy killifish was formally described by David Starr Jordan as Heterandria ommata in 1884, the type locality being given as Indian River, Florida.

References

Fundulidae
Freshwater fish of the Southeastern United States
Monotypic fish genera
Taxa named by David Starr Jordan
Fish described in 1884